Elsinho is a nickname, a diminutive for Elson. It may refer to:

 Elsinho (footballer, born 1989), Elson Ferreira de Souza, Brazilian football right-back
 Elsinho (footballer, born 1991), Elson José Dias Júnior, Brazilian football defensive midfielder